Polaris Pro Grappling is Europe's longest running large-scale professional grappling event.  As of November 2019 Polaris has organised 12 events featuring both Gi and No-Gi matches all of which have been held in the UK.  

Polaris has attracted some of the biggest names from Brazilian Jiu-jitsu, Grappling and Mixed Martial Arts including Keenan Cornelius, Michelle Nicolini,  Brad Pickett, Rousimar Palhares,  Dean Lister, Masakazu Imanari, Ikuhisa Minowa, Vítor Ribeiro, Fernando Terere, Caol Uno, former Strikeforce Middleweight Champion Jake Shields and former UFC Lightweight Champion and WEC Lightweight Champion Benson Henderson.  Former UFC Welterweight competitor. Dan Hardy and UFC referee Marc Goddard have been listed as event judges.

Polaris main bouts are 15 minutes in duration with preliminary bouts lasting 10 minutes. Matches are not points based with competitors able to win either via submission or judges decision.

Current Polaris Title Holders

Polaris 1

Polaris 1 was a grappling event held by Polaris Pro Grappling on January 10, 2015 at St David's Hall in Cardiff, Wales.

Background

Results

Polaris 2

Polaris 2 was a grappling event held by Polaris Pro Grappling on September 12, 2015 at St David's Hall in Cardiff, Wales.

Background

Results

Polaris 3

Polaris 3 was a grappling event held by Polaris Pro Grappling on April 2, 2016 at the Lighthouse in Poole, England.

Background

Results

Polaris 4

Polaris 4 was a grappling event held by Polaris Pro Grappling on October 29, 2016 at the Lighthouse in Poole, England.

Background

Results

Polaris 5

Polaris 5 was a grappling event held by Polaris Pro Grappling on August 19, 2017 at the Indigo at The O2 in London, England.

Background

Results

Polaris 6

Polaris 6 was a grappling event held by Polaris Pro Grappling on February 17, 2018 at the Indigo at The O2 in London, England.

Background

Results

Polaris 7

Polaris 7 was a grappling event held by Polaris Pro Grappling on July 14, 2018 at the Indigo at The O2 in London, England.

Background

Results

Polaris 8

Polaris 8 was a grappling event held by Polaris Pro Grappling on December 9, 2018 at the Ice Arena Wales in Cardiff, Wales.

Background
The event was the third the Polaris has hosted at the Ice Arena Wales in Cardiff, Wales and the first since Polaris 2.

This event featured three world title fights. The card was headlined by the current Polaris middleweight Champion Craig Jones and the former IBJJF champion Keenan Cornelius in a match to crown the inaugural Polaris Light Heavyweight Champion. It was a rematch from their fight at ADCC 2017, which Cornelius had won.

Results

Polaris 9

Polaris 9 was a grappling event held by Polaris Pro Grappling on March 15, 2019 at the Indigo at The O2 in London, England.

Background
The event was the fourth the Polaris has hosted at the Indigo at The O2 in London, England. The card was headlined by a catchweight superfight between the multiple-time MMA champion Jake Shields and future Bellator MMA Middleweight Champion and grappling champion Rafael Lovato Jr.

In the co-featured slot, for inaugural the Polaris Women Under 55KG Championship a bout between IBJJF(2018) champion Ffion Davies and IBJJF(2013/2014/2016) champion Gezary Matuda took place.

Bonus awards

The following fighters were awarded bonuses:
 Performance of the Night: Ffion Davies
 Submission of the Night: Ethan Crelinsten

Results

Polaris 10

Polaris 10 was a grappling event held by Polaris Pro Grappling on May 25, 2019 at the Lighthouse in Poole, England.

Background
Brad Pickett was scheduled to face Caol Uno at Polaris 10, but Pickett was forced off the card on March 12 with an injury. Leigh Remedios has stepped in on short notice to face Uno.

Results

Polaris 11

Polaris 11 was  a grappling event held by Polaris Pro Grappling on August 31, 2019 at the Bridgewater Hall in Manchester, England.

Background
Vagner Rocha has had to pull out of his title fight against Mansher Khera. However, Edwin Najmi stepping up on short notice to face Khera.

Marc Diakiese has had to pull out of his match with Chris Fishgold, however, Diakiese's training partner and grappling instructor, Liam Cann, will be stepping in on short notice to test himself against the powerful UFC grappler.

Unfortunately due to a last minute training injury, Satoshi Ishii is unable to compete and so the match with Arya Esfandmaz will have to be postponed.

Results

Polaris 12

Polaris 12 was a grappling event held by Polaris Pro Grappling on November 30, 2019 at the International Convention Centre Wales in Newport, Wales.

Background
João Miyao has been forced to withdraw from his scheduled Polaris Bantamweight Championship bout against Ashley Williams due to an injury, Azize Hlali has stepped in as a replacement. Unfortunately, Hlali has been unable to compete. Williams instead faced Richard Alarcon, who stepped in on a weeks notice for this encounter.

Fight Card

Polaris 13: UK Grand Prix

Polaris 13: UK Grand Prix was a grappling event held by Polaris Pro Grappling on July 11th, 2020 at the International Convention Centre Wales in Newport, Wales.

Background

Differing from the previous Polaris events, the event was a one-night tournament with all eight competitors weighing in at under 90kg.

Fight Card

Polaris 14: Squads

Background
Polaris 14: Squads was the first event of the promotion's new format that featured two teams of eight grapplers, four under 75 kg and four under 95 kg on each team. They competed across an eighty-minute time period, split into two halves. The first event of its kind to use this unique ruleset, it saw UFC veterans and elite BJJ black belts representing Team UK and Ireland, and Team Europe. The event also featured a non-title superfight between Ffion Davies and Magdalena Loska.

Team UK and Ireland

-75kg

Ashley Williams

Tom Halpin

Dominic Dillon

Jed Hue

Conor McGregor

-95kg

Darragh O'Connail

Bradley Hill

Kieran Davern

Taylor Pearman

Mike Tyson

Team Europe

-75kg

Mateusz Szczeciński

Tommi Pulkkanen

Kamil Wilk

Dinu Bucalet

Garry Tonon

-95kg

Eduardo 'Teta' Rios

Marcin Held

Tarik Hopstock

Santeri Lilius

Andrew Golota

Results

After a total of seventeen matches, Team UK & Ireland won the event 1–0. Fifteen of the matches ended in a draw and double-elimination, with the only submission coming from Tom Halpin. He submitted Dinu Bucalet via Triangle Choke late in the first half. The main event superfight saw Ffion Davies defeat Magdalena Loska via Rear-Naked Choke.

Polaris 15: Squads 2

Background
Polaris 15: Squads 2 changed the format slightly from their first Squads event, with this edition being contested in the gi instead and the presence of Team UK instead of the addition of Ireland. Team Europe remained unchanged, although the lineup for both teams was drastically different from the first event, owing to the switch from no gi to gi. The superfight for this event featured a contest for the promotion's vacant Featherweight Championship between former Squads teammates, Ashley Williams and Tom Halpin.

Team UK

-75kg

Bryn Jenkins

Adam Adshead

Tyrone Elliott

Sam Gibson

-95kg

Arya Esfandmaz

Bradley Hill

Jamie Paxman

Marcos Nardini

Team Europe

-75kg

Espen Mathiesen

Tommi Pulkkanen

Leon Larman

Dinu Bucalet

-95kg

Adam Wardzinski

Tommy Langaker

Luca Anacoreta

Max Lindblad

Results

After a total of twenty-two matches, Team Europe won the event 9–0. Eight of the matches ended in a finish, with the remaining fourteen being declared a draw and Team Europe being awarded a bonus point as Bryn Jenkins was forced to withdraw after half-time due to an injury. Tommy Langaker submitted Bryn Jenkins via Armbar, Marcos Nardini via Triangle Choke, and Sam Gibson via Cross-Collar Choke. Leon Larman submitted Tyrone Elliott via Bow and Arrow Choke, and both Adam Adshead and Sam Gibson via Collar Choke. Dinu Bucalet submitted Tyrone Elliott via Ezekiel Choke and Luca Anacoreta submitted Jamie Paxman via Reverse Triangle Choke. The superfight between Ashley Williams and Tom Halpin went the full fifteen minutes before Williams was declared the victor by decision, making him the first three-weight champion in Polaris history.

Polaris 16: Squads 3

Background
Polaris 16: Squads 3 is an upcoming event scheduled for August 7th, 2021. This event will see a return to the competition being contested without the use of a gi, and will also be the first time that Team USA will appear, competing against Team UK & Ireland. Darragh O'Connail will return to serve as captain for Team UK & Ireland, while Geo and Richie Martinez will be taking up positions as Co-Captains for Team USA. This event will also be the first of the Polaris Squads events to feature preliminary matches as well as a superfight for the promotion's Heavyweight title, with the running order as follows:

Preliminary Matches
Jack Sear v Ciaran Brohan

Walli Abdullah v Ollie Bates

Libby Genge v Bryony Tyrell

Charlie Baker v Mason Guard

Superfight

Nastasa Silviu Georgian v Kyle Boehm

Team UK and Ireland

-75kg

Jed Hue

Ellis Younger

Ross Nicholls

Darragh O'Connaill

-95kg

Dan Strauss

Bradley Hill

Kieran Davern

Ben Dyson

Team USA

-75kg

Geo Martinez

Adam Benayoun

Nathan Orchard

Nick Ronan

-95kg

Roberto Jimenez

Jon 'Thor' Blank

Richie 'Boogieman' Martinez

Hunter Colvin

Results

After a total of twenty-seven matches, Team USA won the event 7–0. Three of the matches ended in a finish, with the remaining twenty-four being declared a draw. Nathan Orchard earned three points by submitting Kieran Davern with a modified twister, Roberto Jimenez earned a point by submitting Bradley Hill with a rear-naked choke, and Geo Martinez earned three points when Dan Strauss was injured during their match and could not continue. The superfight ended with Kyle Boehm submitting Nastasa Silviu Georgian with a belly-down heelhook in less than a minute to become the Polaris Heavyweight Champion.

Polaris 17

Background

For the first time since Polaris 12, the promotion returned to the superfight format with the event held October 9th, 2021 in the Central Hall, Southampton, UK. 
Craig Jones defended his Polaris Middleweight title and Kendall Reusing capturing the Women's inaugural Polaris Openweight title.

Fight Card

Polaris 18

Background 
Polaris 18 took place at ICC Wales on 27 November 2021.

Fight Card

Polaris 19

Background 

Polaris 19 is a professional grappling event that took take place on 26 March 2022, in Southampton, England.

Fight Card
Results

Polaris 20: Squads 4

Background 

Polaris 20: Squads 4 is a professional grappling event that took take place on 25 June 2022, in Newport, Wales. This was the fourth edition of the Squads format that featured Team USA defending their status as champions against Team Brazil.

Superfight 

Demian Maia v Benson Henderson

Team USA

-75kg 

Geo Martinez

Keith Krikorian

Nathan Orchard

Nick Ronan

-95kg 

Mason Fowler

Richie 'Boogieman' Martinez

Jon 'Thor' Blank

Hunter Colvin

Team Brazil

-75kg 

Luiz Paulo

Fabricio Andrey

Marcelo Fausto

Diogo Reis

-95kg 

Kywan Gracie

Igor Tanabe

Isaque Bahiense

Mica Galvao

Results 

After a total of twenty-six matches, Team Brazil won the event 2-1. Three of the matches ended in a finish, with the remaining twenty-three being declared a draw. Mason Fowler submitted Kywan Gracie with an armbar to register the first point of the match, and the only point for Team USA. Mica Galvao then submitted Keith Krikorian with an armbar in order to bring the score to 1-1, before he submitted Krikorian once again with a triangle choke in order to take the score to 2-1. The superfight ended with Demian Maia defeating Benson Henderson by Decision.

Polaris 21: Grapple Island

Background

Polaris 21: Grapple Island was a grappling event held by Polaris Pro Grappling on September 24, 2022 at the end of the BJJ Summer Week in Cagliari, Sardinia. This marked the very first time that the promotion held an event outside of the UK.

Results

Polaris 22: Middleweight Grand Prix

Background

Polaris 22: Middleweight Grand Prix was a grappling event held by Polaris Pro Grappling on November 5, 2022. The event featured several superfights along with a middleweight grand prix that saw the winner crowned the new Middleweight world champion. Oliver Taza, Jed Hue, Mateusz Szczecinski, Roberto Jimenez, Hunter Colvin, Alan Sanchez, Owen Livesey, and Shane Fishman all competed in the tournament.

Fight Card

Polaris 23: Women's Under 66kg Grand Prix

Background

Polaris 23 was announced in December, 2022, when the promotion confirmed that the event would feature a grand prix tournament in the women's 66kg division. The main event was announced as Owen Livesey v Chris Weidman, and the tournament was scheduled to feature Ffion Davies, Maggie Grindatti, Giovanna Jara, Amy Campo, Brianna Ste-Marie, Julia Maele, and Elisabeth Clay. Jara missed weight by 0.9kg prior to the event and she was allowed to compete, although she was not eligible to win the title in the event that she won. Elisabeth Clay won the tournament and was crowned the under 66kg champion.

Fight card

Polaris 24: Men's Under 70kg grand prix

Background

Polaris 24 was announced in January 2023 and the promotion confirmed that a men's under 70kg tournament would take place at the event. During the live broadcast of Polaris 23 the main event was revealed to be a lightweight title-fight between Ryan Hall and the reigning champion Ashley Williams.

Awards 
In 2020 Polaris won Jitsmagazine BJJ Awards "Promotion of the year".

See also 
 Metamoris
 ADCC Submission Wrestling World Championship

References

External links

Brazilian jiu-jitsu competitions
Grappling competitions
2015 establishments in the United Kingdom
Sports leagues established in 2015
No-Gi Brazilian jiu-jitsu competitions